Orville Maynard Siegfried (February 19, 1903 – May 1965) was a professional American football player for the St. Louis All-Stars. He attended high school in Lee's Summit, Missouri.  He attended Washington & Jefferson College.

Notes
 

Players of American football from Pittsburgh
St. Louis All-Stars players
Washington & Jefferson College alumni
Washington & Jefferson Presidents football players
1903 births
1965 deaths